Sempre Amore is an album by Steve Lacy and Mal Waldron released on the Italian Soul Note label in 1987.  It features duo performances of tunes written by Duke Ellington and Billy Strayhorn.

Reception
The Allmusic review by Scott Yanow awarded the album 4 stars stating "Although adventurous in spots, their interpretations of such pieces as "Johnny Come Lately," "Prelude To A Kiss" and "Smada" are quite respectful and keep the strong melodies in mind. Recommended".

Track listing
 "Johnny Come Lately" (Strayhorn) - 6:40
 "Prelude To A Kiss" (Ellington, Gordon, Mills) - 5:32
 "Star-Crossed Lovers" (Strayhorn, Ellington) - 4:30
 "To The Bitter" (Ellington) - 5:17
 "Azure" (Ellington, Mills) - 4:17
 "Sempre Amore" (Ellington) - 4:42
 "A Flower Is A Lovesome Thing" (Strayhorn) - 5:14
 "Smada" (Strayhorn, Ellington) - 7:02

Recorded February 17, 1986 at Barigozzi Studio, Milan

Personnel
Steve Lacy - soprano saxophone
Mal Waldron - piano

References

1987 albums
Steve Lacy (saxophonist) albums
Mal Waldron albums
Black Saint/Soul Note albums